This is a list of diplomatic missions in Palau. The former capital, Koror, hosts three embassies whilst Airai hosts only one embassy. The capital, Ngerulmud, hosts no embassies.

Embassies

Koror

Airai

Non-Resident Embassies
Resident in Manila, Philippines:

 

Resident in Tokyo, Japan:

 

 
 

 

Resident elsewhere:

 (Canberra)
 (Canberra)
 (Palikir)
 (Suva)
 (Honolulu)
 (Hagåtña)
 (Seoul)
 (Canberra)

Former Embassies
  (closed in 2012)

References

See also
 Foreign relations of Palau
 List of diplomatic missions of Palau

Palau
Diplomatic missions
Diplomatic missions